The 1981 New York City Marathon was the 12th edition of the New York City Marathon and took place in New York City on 25 October.

Results

Men

Women

References

External links

New York City Marathon, 1981
Marathon
New York City Marathon
New York